The Greek genocide, which included the Pontic genocide, was the systematic killing of the Christian Ottoman Greek population of Anatolia which was carried out mainly during World War I and its aftermath (1914–1922) on the basis of their religion and ethnicity. It was perpetrated by the government of the Ottoman Empire led by the Three Pashas and by the Government of the Grand National Assembly led by Mustafa Kemal Atatürk, against the indigenous Greek population of the Empire. The genocide included massacres, forced deportations involving death marches through the Syrian Desert, expulsions, summary executions, and the destruction of Eastern Orthodox cultural, historical, and religious monuments. Several hundred thousand Ottoman Greeks died during this period. Most of the refugees and survivors fled to Greece (adding over a quarter to the prior population of Greece). Some, especially those in Eastern provinces, took refuge in the neighbouring Russian Empire.

By late 1922, most of the Greeks of Asia Minor had either fled or had been killed. Those remaining were transferred to Greece under the terms of the later 1923 population exchange between Greece and Turkey, which formalized the exodus and barred the return of the refugees. Other ethnic groups were similarly attacked by the Ottoman Empire during this period, including Assyrians and Armenians, and some scholars and organizations have recognized these events as part of the same genocidal policy.

The Allies of World War I condemned the Ottoman government–sponsored massacres. In 2007, the International Association of Genocide Scholars passed a resolution recognising the Ottoman campaign against its Christian minorities, including the Greeks, as genocide. Some other organisations have also passed resolutions recognising the Ottoman campaign against these Christian minorities as genocide, as have the national legislatures of Greece, Cyprus, the United States, Sweden, Armenia, the Netherlands, Germany, Austria and the Czech Republic.

Background
At the outbreak of World War I, Asia Minor was ethnically diverse, its population included Turks and Azeris, as well as groups that had inhabited the region prior to the Ottoman conquest, including Pontic Greeks, Caucasus Greeks, Cappadocian Greeks, Armenians, Kurds, Zazas, Georgians, Circassians, Assyrians, Jews, and Laz people.

Among the causes of the Turkish campaign against the Greek-speaking Christian population was a fear that they would welcome liberation by the Ottoman Empire's enemies, and a belief among some Turks that to form a modern country in the era of nationalism it was necessary to purge from their territories all minorities who could threaten the integrity of an ethnically-based Turkish nation.

According to a German military attaché, the Ottoman minister of war Ismail Enver had declared in October 1915 that he wanted to "solve the Greek problem during the war … in the same way he believe[d] he solved the Armenian problem", referring to the Armenian genocide. Germany and the Ottoman Empire were allies immediately before, and during, World War I. By 31 January 1917, the Chancellor of Germany Theobald von Bethmann Hollweg reported that:

Origin of the Greek minority

The Greek presence in Asia Minor dates at least from the Late Bronze Age (1450 BC). The Greek poet Homer lived in the region around 800 BC. The geographer Strabo referred to Smyrna as the first Greek city in Asia Minor, and numerous ancient Greek figures were natives of Anatolia, including the mathematician Thales of Miletus (7th century BC), the pre-Socratic philosopher Heraclitus of Ephesus (6th century BC), and the founder of Cynicism Diogenes of Sinope (4th century BC). Greeks referred to the Black Sea as the "Euxinos Pontos" or "hospitable sea" and starting in the eighth century BC they began navigating its shores and settling along its Anatolian coast. The most notable Greek cities of the Black Sea were Trebizond, Sampsounta, Sinope and Heraclea Pontica.

During the Hellenistic period (334 BC – 1st century BC), which followed the conquests of Alexander the Great, Greek culture and language began to dominate even the interior of Asia Minor. The Hellenization of the region accelerated under Roman and early Byzantine rule, and by the early centuries AD the local Indo-European Anatolian languages had become extinct, being replaced by the Koine Greek language. From this point until the late Middle Ages all of the indigenous inhabitants of Asia Minor practiced Christianity (called Greek Orthodox Christianity after the East–West Schism with the Catholics in 1054) and spoke Greek as their first language.

The resultant Greek culture in Asia Minor flourished during a millennium of rule (4th century – 15th century AD) under the mainly Greek-speaking Eastern Roman Empire. Those from Asia Minor constituted the bulk of the empire's Greek-speaking Orthodox Christians; thus, many renowned Greek figures during late antiquity, the Middle Ages, and the Renaissance came from Asia Minor, including Saint Nicholas (270–343 AD), rhetorician John Chrysostomos (349–407 AD), Hagia Sophia architect Isidore of Miletus (6th century AD), several imperial dynasties, including the Phokas (10th century) and Komnenos (11th century), and Renaissance scholars George of Trebizond (1395–1472) and Basilios Bessarion (1403–1472).

Thus, when the Turkic peoples began their late medieval conquest of Asia Minor, Byzantine Greek citizens were the largest group of inhabitants there. Even after the Turkic conquests of the interior, the mountainous Black Sea coast of Asia Minor remained the heart of a populous Greek Christian state, the Empire of Trebizond, until its eventual conquest by the Ottoman Turks in 1461, a year after the Ottomans conquered the area of Europe which is now the Greek mainland. Over the next four centuries the Greek natives of Asia Minor gradually became a minority in these lands under the now dominant Turkish culture.

Events

Post-Balkan Wars

Beginning in the spring of 1913, the Ottomans implemented a programme of expulsions and forcible migrations, focusing on Greeks of the Aegean region and eastern Thrace, whose presence in these areas was deemed a threat to national security. The Ottoman government adopted a "dual-track mechanism" allowing it to deny responsibility for and prior knowledge of this campaign of intimidation, emptying Christian villages. The involvement in certain cases of local military and civil functionaries in planning and executing anti-Greek violence and looting led ambassadors of Greece and the Great Powers and the Patriarchate to address complaints to the Sublime Porte. In protest to government inaction in the face of these attacks and to the so-called "Muslim boycott" of Greek products that had begun in 1913, the Patriarchate closed Greek churches and schools in June 1914. Responding to international and domestic pressure, Talat Pasha headed a visit in Thrace in April 1914 and later in the Aegean to investigate reports and try to soothe bilateral tension with Greece. While claiming that he had no involvement or knowledge of these events, Talat met with Kuşçubaşı Eşref, head of the "cleansing" operation in the Aegean littoral, during his tour and advised him to be cautious not to be "visible". Also, after 1913 there were organized boycotts against the Greeks, initiated by the Ottoman Interior Ministry who asked the empire's provinces to start them. The British ambassador in Constantinople at that time described the boycott as a direct result of the Committee of Union and Progress and that "Committee emissaries are everywhere instigating the people", adding that every person, Greek or Muslim, who entered a non-muslim shop was beaten.

One of the worst attacks of this campaign attack took place in Phocaea (Greek: Φώκαια), on the night of 12 June 1914, a town in western Anatolia next to Smyrna, where Turkish irregular troops destroyed the city, killing 50 or 100 civilians and causing its population to flee to Greece. French eyewitness Charles Manciet states that the atrocities he had witnessed at Phocaea were of an organized nature that aimed at circling Christian peasant populations of the region. In another attack against Serenkieuy, in Menemen district, the villagers formed armed resistance groups but only a few managed to survive being outnumbered by the attacking Muslim irregular bands. During the summer of the same year the Special Organization (Teşkilat-ı Mahsusa), assisted by government and army officials, conscripted Greek men of military age from Thrace and western Anatolia into Labour Battalions in which hundreds of thousands died. These conscripts, after being sent hundreds of miles into the interior of Anatolia, were employed in road-making, building, tunnel excavating and other field work; but their numbers were heavily reduced through privations and ill-treatment and through outright massacre by their Ottoman guards.

Following similar accords made with Bulgaria and Serbia, the Ottoman Empire signed a small voluntary population exchange agreement with Greece on 14 November 1913. Another such agreement was signed 1 July 1914 for the exchange of some "Turks" (that is, Muslims) of Greece for some Greeks of Aydin and Western Thrace, after the Ottomans had forced these Greeks from their homes in response to the Greek annexation of several islands. The swap was never completed due to the eruption of World War I. While discussions for population exchanges were still conducted, Special Organization units attacked Greek villages forcing their inhabitants to abandon their homes for Greece, being replaced with Muslim refugees.

The forceful expulsion of Christians of western Anatolia, especially Ottoman Greeks, has many similarities with policy towards the Armenians, as observed by US ambassador Henry Morgenthau and historian Arnold Toynbee. In both cases, certain Ottoman officials, such as Şükrü Kaya, Nazım Bey and Mehmed Reshid, played a role; Special Organization units and labour battalions were involved; and a dual plan was implemented combining unofficial violence and the cover of state population policy. This policy of persecution and ethnic cleansing was expanded to other parts of the Ottoman Empire, including Greek communities in Pontus, Cappadocia, and Cilicia.

World War I

According to a newspaper of the time, in November 1914, Turkish troops destroyed Christian properties and murdered several Christians at Trabzon. After November 1914 Ottoman policy towards the Greek population shifted; state policy was restricted to the forceful migration to the Anatolian hinterland of Greeks living in coastal areas, particularly the Black Sea region, close to the Turkish-Russian front. This change of policy was due to a German demand for the persecution of Ottoman Greeks to stop, after Eleftherios Venizelos had made this a condition of Greece's neutrality when speaking to the German ambassador in Athens. Venizelos also threatened to undertake a similar campaign against Muslims that were living in Greece if Ottoman policy did not change. While the Ottoman government tried to implement this change in policy, it was unsuccessful and attacks, even murders, continued to occur unpunished by local officials in the provinces, despite repeated instructions in cables sent from the central administration. Arbitrary violence and extortion of money intensified later, providing ammunition for the Venizelists arguing that Greece should join the Entente.

In July 1915 the Greek chargé d'affaires claimed that the deportations "can not be any other issue than an annihilation war against the Greek nation in Turkey and as measures hereof they have been implementing forced conversions to Islam, in obvious aim to, that if after the end of the war there again would be a question of European intervention for the protection of the Christians, there will be as few of them left as possible." According to George W. Rendel of the British Foreign Office, by 1918 "over 500,000 Greeks were deported of whom comparatively few survived". In his memoirs, the United States ambassador to the Ottoman Empire between 1913 and 1916 wrote "Everywhere the Greeks were gathered in groups and, under the so-called protection of Turkish gendarmes, they were transported, the larger part on foot, into the interior. Just how many were scattered in this fashion is not definitely known, the estimates varying anywhere from 200,000 up to 1,000,000."

Despite the shift of policy, the practice of evacuating Greek settlements and relocating the inhabitants was continued, albeit on a limited scale. Relocation was targeted at specific regions that were considered militarily vulnerable, not the whole of the Greek population. As a 1919 Patriarchate account records, the evacuation of many villages was accompanied with looting and murders, while many died as a result of not having been given the time to make the necessary provisions or of being relocated to uninhabitable places.

State policy towards Ottoman Greeks changed again in the fall of 1916. With Entente forces occupying Lesbos, Chios and Samos since spring, the Russians advancing in Anatolia and Greece expected to enter the war siding with the Allies, preparations were made for the deportation of Greeks living in border areas. In January 1917 Talat Pasha sent a cable for the deportation of Greeks from the Samsun district "thirty to fifty kilometres inland" taking care for "no assaults on any persons or property". However, the execution of government decrees, which took a systematic form from December 1916, when Behaeddin Shakir came to the region, was not conducted as ordered: men were taken in labour battalions, women and children were attacked, villages were looted by Muslim neighbours. As such in March 1917 the population of Ayvalık, a town of c. 30,000 inhabitants on the Aegean coast was forcibly deported to the interior of Anatolia under order by German General Liman von Sanders. The operation included death marches, looting, torture and massacre against the civilian population. Germanos Karavangelis, the bishop of Samsun, reported to the Patriarchate that thirty thousands had been deported to the Ankara region and the convoys of the deportees had been attacked, with many being killed. Talat Pasha ordered an investigation for the looting and destruction of Greek villages by bandits. Later in 1917 instructions were sent to authorize military officials with the control of the operation and to broaden its scope, now including persons from cities in the coastal region. However, in certain areas Greek populations remained undeported.

Greek deportees were sent to live in Greek villages in the inner provinces or, in some case, villages where Armenians were living before being deported. Greek villages evacuated during the war due to military concerns were then resettled with Muslim immigrants and refugees. According to cables sent to the provinces during this time, abandoned movable and non-movable Greek property was not to be liquidated, as that of the Armenians, but "preserved".

On 14 January 1917 Cossva Anckarsvärd, Sweden's Ambassador to Constantinople, sent a dispatch regarding the decision to deport the Ottoman Greeks:

According to Rendel, atrocities such as deportations involving death marches, starvation in labour camps etc. were referred to as "white massacres". Ottoman official Rafet Bey was active in the genocide of the Greeks and in November 1916, Austrian consul in Samsun, Kwiatkowski, reported that he said to him "We must finish off the Greeks as we did with the Armenians ... today I sent squads to the interior to kill every Greek on sight".

Pontic Greeks responded by forming insurgent groups, which carried weapons salvaged from the battlefields of the Caucasus Campaign of World War I or directly supplied by the Russian army. In 1920, the insurgents reached their peak in regard to manpower numbering 18,000 men. On 15 November 1917, Ozakom delegates agreed to create a unified army composed of ethnically homogeneous units, Greeks were allotted a division consisting of three regiments. The Greek Caucasus Division was thus formed out of ethnic Greeks serving in Russian units stationed in the Caucasus and raw recruits from among the local population including former insurgents. The division took part in numerous engagements against the Ottoman army as well as Muslim and Armenian irregulars, safeguarding the withdrawal of Greek refugees into the Russian held Caucasus, before being disbanded in the aftermath of the Treaty of Poti.

Greco-Turkish War

After the Ottoman Empire capitulated on 30 October 1918, it came under the de jure control of the victorious Entente Powers. However, the latter failed to bring the perpetrators of the genocide to justice, although in the Turkish Courts-Martial of 1919–20 a number of leading Ottoman officials were accused of ordering massacres against both Greeks and Armenians. Thus, killings, massacres and deportations continued under the pretext of the national movement of Mustafa Kemal (later Atatürk).

In an October 1920 report a British officer describes the aftermath of the massacres at İznik in north-western Anatolia in which he estimated that at least 100 decomposed mutilated bodies of men, women and children were present in and around a large cave about 300 yards outside the city walls.

The systematic massacre and deportation of Greeks in Asia Minor, a program which had come into effect in 1914, was a precursor to the atrocities perpetrated by both the Greek and Turkish armies during the Greco-Turkish War, a conflict which followed the Greek landing at Smyrna in May 1919 and continued until the retaking of Smyrna by the Turks and the Great Fire of Smyrna in September 1922. Rudolph Rummel estimated the death toll of the fire at 100,000 Greeks and Armenians, who perished in the fire and accompanying massacres. According to Norman M. Naimark "more realistic estimates range between 10,000 to 15,000" for the casualties of the Great Fire of Smyrna. Some 150,000 to 200,000 Greeks were expelled after the fire, while about 30,000 able-bodied Greek and Armenian men were deported to the interior of Asia Minor, most of whom were executed on the way or died under brutal conditions. George W. Rendel of the British Foreign Office noted the massacres and deportations of Greeks during the Greco-Turkish War. According to estimates by Rudolph Rummel, between 213,000 and 368,000 Anatolian Greeks were killed between 1919 and 1922. There were also massacres of Turks carried out by the Hellenic troops during the occupation of western Anatolia from May 1919 to September 1922.

For the massacres that occurred during the Greco-Turkish War of 1919–1922, British historian Arnold J. Toynbee wrote that it was the Greek landings that created the Turkish National Movement led by Mustafa Kemal: "The Greeks of 'Pontus' and the Turks of the Greek occupied territories, were in some degree victims of Mr. Venizelos's and Mr. Lloyd George's original miscalculations at Paris."

Relief efforts

In 1917 a relief organization by the name of the Relief Committee for Greeks of Asia Minor was formed in response to the deportations and massacres of Greeks in the Ottoman Empire. The committee worked in cooperation with the Near East Relief in distributing aid to Ottoman Greeks in Thrace and Asia Minor. The organisation disbanded in the summer of 1921 but Greek relief work was continued by other aid organisations.

Contemporary accounts
German and Austro-Hungarian diplomats, as well as the 1922 memorandum compiled by British diplomat George W. Rendel on "Turkish Massacres and Persecutions", provided evidence for series of systematic massacres and ethnic cleansing of the Greeks in Asia Minor. The quotes have been attributed to various diplomats, including the German ambassadors Hans Freiherr von Wangenheim and Richard von Kühlmann, the German vice-consul in Samsun Kuchhoff, Austria's ambassador Pallavicini and Samsun consul Ernst von Kwiatkowski, and the Italian unofficial agent in Angora Signor Tuozzi. Other quotes are from clergymen and activists, including the German missionary Johannes Lepsius, and Stanley Hopkins of the Near East Relief. Germany and Austria-Hungary were allied to the Ottoman Empire in World War I.

The accounts describe systematic massacres, rapes and burnings of Greek villages, and attribute intent to Ottoman officials, including the Ottoman Prime Minister Mahmud Sevket Pasha, Rafet Bey, Talat Pasha and Enver Pasha.

Additionally, The New York Times and its correspondents made extensive references to the events, recording massacres, deportations, individual killings, rapes, burning of entire Greek villages, destruction of Greek Orthodox churches and monasteries, drafts for "Labor Brigades", looting, terrorism and other "atrocities" for Greek, Armenian and also for British and American citizens and government officials. Australian press also had some coverage of the events.

Henry Morgenthau, the United States ambassador to the Ottoman Empire from 1913 to 1916, accused the "Turkish government" of a campaign of "outrageous terrorizing, cruel torturing, driving of women into harems, debauchery of innocent girls, the sale of many of them at 80 cents each, the murdering of hundreds of thousands and the deportation to and starvation in the desert of other hundreds of thousands, [and] the destruction of hundreds of villages and many cities", all part of "the willful execution" of a "scheme to annihilate the Armenian, Greek and Syrian Christians of Turkey". However, months prior to the First World War, 100,000 Greeks were deported to Greek islands or the interior which Morgenthau stated, "for the larger part these were bona-fide deportations; that is, the Greek inhabitants were actually removed to new places and were not subjected to wholesale massacre. It was probably the reason that the civilized world did not protest against these deportations".

US Consul-General George Horton, whose account has been criticised by scholars as anti-Turkish, claimed, "One of the cleverest statements circulated by the Turkish propagandists is to the effect that the massacred Christians were as bad as their executioners, that it was '50–50'." On this issue he comments: "Had the Greeks, after the massacres in the Pontus and at Smyrna, massacred all the Turks in Greece, the record would have been 50–50—almost." As an eye-witness, he also praises Greeks for their "conduct ... toward the thousands of Turks residing in Greece, while the ferocious massacres were going on", which, according to his opinion, was "one of the most inspiring and beautiful chapters in all that country's history".

Casualties

According to Benny Morris and Dror Ze'evi in The Thirty-Year Genocide, as a result of Ottoman and Turkish state policy, "several hundred thousand Ottoman Greeks had died. Either they were murdered outright or were the intentional victims of hunger, disease, and exposure."

For the whole of the period between 1914 and 1922 and for the whole of Anatolia, there are academic estimates of death toll ranging from 289,000 to 750,000. The figure of 750,000 is suggested by political scientist Adam Jones. Scholar Rudolph Rummel compiled various figures from several studies to estimate lower and higher bounds for the death toll between 1914 and 1923. He estimates that 84,000 Greeks were exterminated from 1914 to 1918, and 264,000 from 1919 to 1922. The total number reaching 347,000. Historian Constantine G. Hatzidimitriou writes that "loss of life among Anatolian Greeks during the WWI period and its aftermath was approximately 735,370". Erik Sjöberg states that "[a]ctivists tend to inflate the overall total of Ottoman Greek deaths" over what he considers "the cautious estimates between 300,000 to 700,000".

Some contemporary sources claimed different death tolls. The Greek government collected figures together with the Patriarchate to claim that a total of one million people were massacred. A team of American researchers found in the early postwar period that the total number of Greeks killed may approach 900,000 people. Edward Hale Bierstadt, writing in 1924, stated that "According to official testimony, the Turks since 1914 have slaughtered in cold blood 1,500,000 Armenians, and 500,000 Greeks, men women and children, without the slightest provocation." On 4 November 1918, Emanuel Efendi, an Ottoman deputy of Aydin, criticised the ethnic cleansing of the previous government and reported that 550,000 Greeks had been killed in the coastal regions of Anatolia (including the Black Sea coast) and Aegean Islands during the deportations.

According to various sources the Greek death toll in the Pontus region of Anatolia ranges from 300,000 to 360,000. Merrill D. Peterson cites the death toll of 360,000 for the Greeks of Pontus. According to George K. Valavanis, "The loss of human life among the Pontian Greeks, since the Great War (World War I) until March 1924, can be estimated at 353,000, as a result of murders, hangings, and from punishment, disease, and other hardships." Valavanis derived this figure from the 1922 record of the Central Pontian Council in Athens based on the Black Book of the Ecumenical Patriarchate, to which he adds "50,000 new martyrs", which "came to be included in the register by spring 1924".

Aftermath
Article 142 of the 1920 Treaty of Sèvres, prepared after the first World War, called the Turkish regime "terrorist" and contained provisions "to repair so far as possible the wrongs inflicted on individuals in the course of the massacres perpetrated in Turkey during the war." The Treaty of Sèvres was never ratified by the Turkish government and ultimately was replaced by the Treaty of Lausanne. That treaty was accompanied by a "Declaration of Amnesty", without containing any provision in respect to punishment of war crimes.

In 1923, a population exchange between Greece and Turkey resulted in a near-complete ending of the Greek ethnic presence in Turkey and a similar ending of the Turkish ethnic presence in much of Greece. According to the Greek census of 1928, 1,104,216 Ottoman Greeks had reached Greece. It is impossible to know exactly how many Greek inhabitants of Turkey died between 1914 and 1923, and how many ethnic Greeks of Anatolia were expelled to Greece or fled to the Soviet Union. Some of the survivors and expelled took refuge in the neighboring Russian Empire (later, Soviet Union). Similar plans for a population exchange had been negotiated earlier, in 1913–1914, between Ottoman and Greek officials during the first stage of the Greek genocide but had been interrupted by the onset of World War I.

In December 1924, The New York Times reported that 400 tonnes of human bones consigned to manufacturers were transported from Mudania to Marseille, which might be the remains of massacred victims in Asia Minor.

In 1955, the Istanbul Pogrom caused most of the remaining Greek inhabitants of Istanbul to flee the country. Historian Alfred-Maurice de Zayas identifies the pogrom as a crime against humanity and he states that the flight and migration of Greeks afterwards corresponds to the "intent to destroy in whole or in part" criteria of the Genocide Convention.

Genocide recognition

Terminology

The word genocide was coined in the early 1940s, the era of the Holocaust, by Raphael Lemkin, a Polish lawyer of Jewish descent. In his writings on genocide, Lemkin is known to have detailed the fate of Greeks in Turkey. In August 1946 the New York Times reported:

The 1948 Convention on the Prevention and Punishment of the Crime of Genocide (CPPCG) was adopted by the United Nations General Assembly in December 1948 and came into force in January 1951. It includes a legal definition of genocide. 
Before the creation of the term "genocide", the destruction of the Ottoman Greeks was known by Greeks as "the Massacre", "the Great Catastrophe", or "the Great Tragedy". The Ottoman and Kemalist nationalist massacres of the Greeks in Anatolia, constituted genocide under the initial definition and international criminal application of the term, as in the international criminal tribunals authorized by the United Nations.

Academic discussion

In December 2007 the International Association of Genocide Scholars (IAGS) passed a resolution affirming that the 1914–23 campaign against Ottoman Greeks constituted genocide "qualitatively similar" to the Armenian genocide. IAGS President Gregory Stanton urged the Turkish government to finally acknowledge the three genocides: "The history of these genocides is clear, and there is no more excuse for the current Turkish government, which did not itself commit the crimes, to deny the facts." Drafted by Canadian scholar Adam Jones, the resolution was adopted on 1 December 2007 with the support of 83% of all voting IAGS members. Several scholars researching the Armenian genocide, such as Peter Balakian, Taner Akçam, Richard Hovannisian and Robert Melson, however stated that "the issue had to be further researched before a resolution was passed."

Manus Midlarsky notes a disjunction between statements of genocidal intent against the Greeks by Ottoman officials and their actions, pointing to the containment of massacres in selected "sensitive" areas and the large numbers of Greek survivors at the end of the war. Because of cultural and political ties of the Ottoman Greeks with European powers, Midlarsky argues, genocide was "not a viable option for the Ottomans in their case." Taner Akçam refers to contemporary accounts noting the difference in government treatment of Ottoman Greeks and Armenians during WW I and concludes that "despite the increasingly severe wartime policies, in particular for the period between late 1916 and the first months of 1917, the government's treatment of the Greeks – although comparable in some ways to the measures against the Armenians – differed in scope, intent, and motivation."

This is also a position of some Greek mainstream historians; according to Aristide Caratzas this is due to a number of factors, "which range from governmental reticence to criticize Turkey to spilling over into the academic world, to ideological currents promoting a diffuse internationalism cultivated by a network of NGOs, often supported by western governments and western interests". Others, such as Dominik J. Schaller and Jürgen Zimmerer, argue that the "genocidal quality of the murderous campaigns against Greeks" was "obvious". The historians Samuel Totten and Paul R. Bartrop, who specialize on the history of genocides, also call it a genocide; so is Alexander Kitroeff. Another scholar who considers it a genocide is Hannibal Travis; he also adds that the widespread attacks by the successive governments of Turkey, on the homes, places of worship, and heritage of minority communities since the 1930s, constitute cultural genocide as well.

Dror Ze'evi and Benny Morris, authors of The Thirty-Year Genocide, write that "the story about what happened in Turkey is much broader and deeper [than just the Armenian genocide]. It's deeper because it isn't just about World War I, but about a series of homicidal ethno-religious cleansings that took place from the late 1890s to the 1920s and beyond. It is wider because the victims weren't only Armenians. Alongside hundreds of thousands of Armenians... Greeks and Assyrians... were massacred in similar numbers... We estimate that during the 30 year period that we studied between a million and a half and two and a half million Christians from all three religious groups were murdered or intentionally left for dead of starvation and sickness, and millions of others were deported and lost everything. In addition, tens of thousands of Christians were forced to convert, and many thousands of girls and women were raped by their Muslim neighbors and the security forces. The Turks even set up markets where Christian girls were sold as sex slaves. These horrendous acts were committed by three entirely different regimes: the authoritarian-Islamist regime of Sultan Abdul Hamid II, the wartime regime of the Committee of Union and Progress ("The Young Turks") led by Talaat and Enver, and the nationalist-secular post-war regime of Mustafa Kemal Atatürk."

Political recognition
Following an initiative of MPs of the so-called "patriotic" wing of the ruling PASOK party's parliamentary group and like-minded MPs of conservative New Democracy, the Greek Parliament passed two laws on the fate of the Ottoman Greeks; the first in 1994 and the second in 1998. The decrees were published in the Greek Government Gazette on 8 March 1994 and 13 October 1998 respectively. The 1994 decree, created by Georgios Daskalakis, affirmed the genocide in the Pontus region of Asia Minor and designated 19 May (the day Mustafa Kemal landed in Samsun in 1919) a day of commemoration, (called Pontian Greek Genocide Remembrance Day) while the 1998 decree affirmed the genocide of Greeks in Asia Minor as a whole and designated 14 September a day of commemoration. These laws were signed by the President of Greece but were not immediately ratified after political interventions. After leftist newspaper I Avgi initiated a campaign against the application of this law, the subject became subject of a political debate. The president of the left-ecologist Synaspismos party Nikos Konstantopoulos and historian Angelos Elefantis, known for his books on the history of Greek communism, were two of the major figures of the political left who expressed their opposition to the decree. However, the non-parliamentary left-wing nationalist intellectual and author George Karabelias bitterly criticized Elefantis and others opposing the recognition of genocide and called them "revisionist historians", accusing the Greek mainstream left of a "distorted ideological evolution". He said that for the Greek left 19 May is a "day of amnesia".

In the late 2000s the Communist Party of Greece adopted the term "Genocide of the Pontic (Greeks)" in its official newspaper Rizospastis and participates in memorial events.

The Republic of Cyprus has also officially called the events "Greek Genocide in Pontus of Asia Minor".

In response to the 1998 law, the Turkish government released a statement which claimed that describing the events as genocide was "without any historical basis". "We condemn and protest this resolution" a Turkish Foreign Ministry statement said. "With this resolution the Greek Parliament, which in fact has to apologize to the Turkish people for the large-scale destruction and massacres Greece perpetrated in Anatolia, not only sustains the traditional Greek policy of distorting history, but it also displays that the expansionist Greek mentality is still alive," the statement added.

On 11 March 2010, Sweden's Riksdag passed a motion recognising "as an act of genocide the killing of Armenians, Assyrians/Syriacs/Chaldeans and Pontic Greeks in 1915".

On 14 May 2013, the government of New South Wales was submitted a genocide recognition motion by Fred Nile of the Christian Democratic Party, which was later passed making it the fourth political entity to recognise the genocide.

In March 2015, the National Assembly of Armenia unanimously adopted a resolution recognizing both the Greek and Assyrian genocides.

In April 2015, the States General of the Netherlands and the Austrian Parliament passed resolutions recognizing the Greek and Assyrian genocides.

Reasons for limited recognition

The United Nations, the European Parliament, and the Council of Europe have not made any related statements. According to Constantine Fotiadis, professor of Modern Greek History at the Aristotle University of Thessaloniki, some of the reasons for the lack of wider recognition and delay in seeking acknowledgement of these events are as follows:
 In contrast to the Treaty of Sèvres, the superseding Treaty of Lausanne in 1923 dealt with these events by making no reference or mention, and thus sealed the end of the Asia Minor Catastrophe.
A subsequent peace treaty (Greco-Turkish Treaty of Friendship in June 1930) between Greece and Turkey. Greece made several concessions to settle all open issues between the two countries in return for peace in the region.
The Second World War, the Civil War, the Military junta and the political turmoil in Greece that followed, forced Greece to focus on its survival and other problems rather than seek recognition of these events.
The political environment of the Cold War, in which Turkey and Greece were supposed to be allies – facing one common Communist enemy – not adversaries or competitors.

In his book With Intent to Destroy: Reflections on Genocide, Colin Tatz argues that Turkey denies the genocide so as not to jeopardize "its ninety-five-year-old dream of becoming the beacon of democracy in the Near East".

In their book Negotiating the Sacred: Blasphemy and Sacrilege in a Multicultural Society, Elizabeth Burns Coleman and Kevin White present a list of reasons explaining Turkey's inability to admit the genocides committed by the Young Turks, writing: 

They propose the following reasons for the denial of the genocides by Turkey:

Genocide as a model for future crimes

According to Stefan Ihrig, Kemal's "model" remained active for the Nazi movement in Weimar Germany and the Third Reich until the end of World War II. Adolf Hitler had declared that he considered himself a "student" of Kemal, whom he referred to as his "star in the darkness", while the latter's contribution to the formation of National Socialist ideology is intensely apparent in Nazi literature. Kemal and his new Turkey of 1923 constituted the archetype of the "perfect Führer" and of "good national practices" for Nazism. The news media of the Third Reich emphasised the "Turkish model" and continuously praised the "benefits" of ethnic cleansing and genocide. Hitler referred to Kemal as being of Germanic descent.

Hitler's National Socialist Party, from its first steps, had used the methods of the Turkish state as a standard to draw inspiration from. The official Nazi newspaper Völkischer Beobachter ("Völkisch Observer"), on its February 1921 issue, stressed with admiration in an article titled "The Role Model": "The German nation will one day have no other choice but to resort to Turkish methods as well."

A Nazi publication of 1925 exalted the new Turkish state for its "cleansing" policy, which "threw the Greek element to the sea". The majority of writers of the Third Reich stressed that the double genocide (against Greeks and Armenians) was a prerequisite for the success of the new Turkey, the NSDAP claimed: "Only through the annihilation of the Greek and the Armenian tribes in Anatolia was the creation of a Turkish national state and the formation of an unflawed Turkish body of society within one state possible."

Memorials

Memorials commemorating the plight of Ottoman Greeks have been erected throughout Greece, as well as in a number of other countries including Australia, Canada, Germany, Sweden, and the United States.

Literature
The Greek genocide is remembered in a number of modern works.

 Not Even My Name by Thea Halo is the story of the survival, at age ten, of her mother Sano (Themia) Halo (original name Euthemia "Themia" Barytimidou,), along the death march during the Greek genocide that annihilated her family. The title refers to Themia being renamed to Sano by an Arabic-speaking family who could not pronounce her Greek name, after they took her in as a servant during the Greek genocide.
 Number 31328 is an autobiography by the Greek novelist Elias Venezis that tells of his experiences during the Greek genocide on a death march into the interior from his native home in Ayvali (Greek:), Turkey. Of the 3000 "conscripted" into his "labour brigade" (otherwise known as Amele Taburlari or Amele Taburu) only 23 survived. The title refers to the number assigned to Elias by the Turkish army during the death march. The book was made into a movie called 1922 by Nikos Koundouros in 1978, but was banned in Greece until 1982 because of pressure from the Turkish Foreign Ministry who complained that the film would ruin Greek-Turkish relations.

See also

 Armenian genocide
 Assyrian genocide
 Burning of Smyrna
 Deportations of Kurds (1916–1934)
 Greek refugees
 Human rights in Turkey
 Istanbul pogrom
 İzmit massacres
 Outline and timeline of the Greek genocide
 Republic of Pontus
 Tel Aviv and Jaffa deportation

References

Citations

Sources

Notes

Bibliography

Contemporary accounts
 
 .
 .
 .
 Alt URL
 .
 .
 .

Secondary sources
 
 
 
 
 
 .
 .
 .
 .
 .
 .
 .
 
 .
 .
 .
 .
 
 
 
 .
 
 Naimark, Norman M. (2001). Fires of Hatred: Ethnic Cleansing in Twentieth-Century Europe, Cambridge and London: Harvard University Press.
 .
 
 .

Further reading

Books
 
 Andreadis, George, Tamama: The Missing Girl of Pontos, Athens: Gordios, 1993.
 .
 .
 Compton, Carl C. The Morning Cometh, New Rochelle, NY: Aristide D. Caratzas, 1986.
 .
 . In fourteen volumes, including eleven volumes of materials (vols. 4–14). 
 .
 King, Charles (2005). The Black Sea: A History, Oxford: Oxford University Press
 Koromila, Marianna (2002). The Greeks and the Black Sea, Panorama Cultural Society.
 .
 .
 .
 .
 Housepian Dobkin, Marjorie. Smyrna 1922: the Destruction of a City, New York, NY: Newmark Press, 1998.
Lieberman, Benjamin (2006). Terrible Fate: Ethnic Cleansing in the Making of Modern Europe, Ivan R. Dee.
 de Murat, Jean. The Great Extirpation of Hellenism and Christianity in Asia Minor: the historic and systematic deception of world opinion concerning the hideous Christianity's uprooting of 1922, Miami, FL (Athens, GR: A. Triantafillis) 1999.
 Papadopoulos, Alexander. Persecutions of the Greeks in Turkey before the European War: on the basis of official documents, New York: Oxford University Press, American branch, 1919.
 Pavlides, Ioannis. Pages of History of Pontus and Asia Minor, Salonica, GR, 1980.
.
 Sjöberg, Erik. THE MAKING OF THE GREEK GENOCIDE Contested Memories of the Ottoman Greek Catastrophe, 2016.
 Shenk, Robert. "America's Black Sea Fleet - The U.S. Navy Amid War and Revolution,1919-1923", Naval Institute Press, Annapolis Maryland, 2012

 Tsirkinidis, Harry. At last we uprooted them... The Genocide of Greeks of Pontos, Thrace, and Asia Minor, through the French archives, Thessaloniki: Kyriakidis Bros, 1999.
 Ward, Mark H. The Deportations in Asia Minor 1921–1922, London: Anglo-Hellenic League, 1922.

Articles

External links

 Bibliography at Greek Genocide Resource Center
 "Massacre of Greeks Charged to the Turks",The Atlanta Constitution. 17 June 1914.
 "Reports Massacres of Greeks in Pontus; Central Council Says They Attend Execution of Prominent Natives for Alleged Rebellion." The New York Times. Sunday 6 November 1921.

 
Greeks from the Ottoman Empire
Genocides in Asia
Ethnic cleansing in Europe
Ethnic cleansing in Asia
Massacres in the Ottoman Empire
Ottoman Pontus
World War I crimes by the Ottoman Empire
Forced marches
Greco-Turkish War (1919–1922)
Turkish War of Independence
History of Greece (1909–1924)
Modern history of Turkey
Committee of Union and Progress
Greece–Turkey relations
Anti-Christian sentiment in Asia
Anti-Christian sentiment in Europe
Anti-Greek sentiment
Persecution of Greeks in Turkey
Persecution of Christians in the Ottoman Empire
Persecution of Greeks in the Ottoman Empire in the 20th century
1910s in the Ottoman Empire
1920s in the Ottoman Empire
1920s in Turkey
Massacres of Christians
Persecution by Muslims